Richard Dillane (born 1964) is a British actor. He appears in a lead role of the Netflix series Young Wallander, based on the character Kurt Wallander created by novelist Henning Mankell. He played British intelligence agent Peter Nicholls in Ben Affleck's Oscar-winning 2012 political thriller Argo, and Merv Humphreys, husband of Margaret Humphreys (played by Emily Watson) in Jim Loach's fact-based movie Oranges and Sunshine.

He was Wernher von Braun in the BBC television docudrama Space Race, Nero in Howard Brenton's play Paul at the National Theatre of Great Britain and appeared several times as Stephen Maturin in the BBC radio adaptations of the Patrick O'Brian Aubrey–Maturin novels and Peter Guillam in three John le Carré adaptations.

Early life and education
Dillane grew up near London with his brother Stephen (also an actor), took a philosophy degree at Manchester University and lived in Australia for ten years, working in Perth, Sydney and Hobart as an actor and director, before returning to the UK.

Career

Dillane's other film work includes The Dark Knight (as Acting Commissioner), Mindscape with Mark Strong, The Dinosaur Project, The Edge of Love, The Jacket, Tristan & Isolde and as Cole Porter's last lover Bill Wrather (a composite character) in Irwin Winkler's biopic De-Lovely, which starred Kevin Kline.

Recent television work includes Giri/Haji, The Last Kingdom, Peaky Blinders, Counterpart, Outlander, The Last Post, and Star Wars: Andor.

In 2015, he played Duke of Suffolk in the BBC TV series Wolf Hall , and in 2016 he appeared in the lead role of DCI Michael Waite in a double episode of the BBC TV series Silent Witness.

Prior to this, he played the captain of the shape-changing justice robot Teselecta in two episodes of Doctor Who ("Let's Kill Hitler" and "The Wedding of River Song"), rogue spy John Richardson in Spooks, Australian conman Graham Poole in Hustle, photographer and old flame Miles Brodie in Cold Feet, posh drug addict Theodore Platt in the first episode of Lewis and the relationship counsellor Ben in Men Behaving Badly as well as regular characters Sean Anderson in Casualty and Australian sergeant Brad Connor in the award-winning  ITV series Soldier Soldier.

On stage, Dillane has performed at the National Theatre of Great Britain in London and the Royal Shakespeare Company in Stratford-upon-Avon. In 2000, he was the 1st Duke of Suffolk in the Olivier Award-winning Michael Boyd productions of Henry VI parts 1, 2 and 3 in Stratford, London and Michigan. At 24, he played Hamlet in Perth, Australia, directed by Ray Omodei.

He is also a regular radio actor and voice-over artist.

Personal life
His essay 'Making Sense of "To be, or not to be"', about Hamlet's soliloquy, was published in Shakespeare and Montaigne.

He is married to Scottish actress Jayne McKenna, known for her leading role in the 2017 Take That musical The Band. They have three children.

Filmography

Film

Television

Theatre credits

References

External links

Richard Dillane profile, radiolistings.co.uk; accessed 2 March 2016.

1964 births
English male film actors
English male radio actors
English male television actors
Living people
Date of birth missing (living people)
Place of birth missing (living people)
20th-century English male actors
21st-century English male actors
Alumni of the University of Manchester